Thelairosoma is a genus of parasitic flies in the family Tachinidae. There are more than 20 described species in Thelairosoma.

Species
These 23 species belong to the genus Thelairosoma:

 Thelairosoma angustifrons (Villeneuve, 1916)
 Thelairosoma atrum Mesnil, 1970
 Thelairosoma brunnescens (Villeneuve, 1934)
 Thelairosoma carbonatum (Mesnil, 1944)
 Thelairosoma coerulescens Mesnil, 1954
 Thelairosoma comatum Villeneuve, 1938
 Thelairosoma diaphanum Mesnil, 1954
 Thelairosoma flavipalpe Villeneuve, 1938
 Thelairosoma fumosum Villeneuve, 1916
 Thelairosoma hybridum Mesnil, 1970
 Thelairosoma ingrami Mesnil, 1970
 Thelairosoma longicorne Mesnil, 1954
 Thelairosoma lutescens Mesnil, 1954
 Thelairosoma major Mesnil, 1970
 Thelairosoma melancholicum Mesnil, 1970
 Thelairosoma obversum Villeneuve, 1943
 Thelairosoma pallidum Mesnil, 1954
 Thelairosoma palposum Villeneuve, 1938
 Thelairosoma pulchellum (Mesnil, 1944)
 Thelairosoma quadriguttatum (Mesnil, 1944)
 Thelairosoma rosatum Villeneuve, 1943
 Thelairosoma triste Mesnil, 1970
 Thelairosoma varipes Villeneuve, 1943

References

Further reading

 
 
 
 

Tachinidae
Monotypic Brachycera genera
Articles created by Qbugbot